Rahera (Rachel) Windsor QSM (born Rahera Honi Heta, 13 March 1925 – 3 May 2004) was a kuia (female elder) of the UK Māori community, and one of the founding members of Ngāti Rānana.

Biography 

Windsor was born in Pupuke, near Kaeo, in the Northland of New Zealand, in 1925.  She left Northland for Auckland at an early age, and thereafter moved to the South Island where she worked as a Land Girl.  She married a British naval engineer in 1951, subsequently relocating to the United Kingdom.  Soon after her arrival in the UK she became actively involved in the celebration and promotion of Māori cultural and spiritual interests.

Additional information 

Windsor has been recognised for her contributions to the development of the relationship between Ngāti Rānana and Ngāti Hinemihi. She was awarded the Queen's Service Medal for Community Service in 1996.

The "Rahera Windsor Award for New Zealand Studies" has been issued by the New Zealand Studies Association since April 2005, and is named in her honour.

References and links 

Recipients of the Queen's Service Medal
British people of Māori descent
New Zealand expatriates in the United Kingdom
1925 births
2004 deaths
People from the Northland Region